Little Cedar is an unincorporated community and census-designated place in central Mitchell County, Iowa, United States.  It lies along local roads northeast of the city of Osage, the county seat of Mitchell County.  Its elevation is 1,194 feet (364 m).  Although Little Cedar is unincorporated, it has a post office, with the ZIP code of 50454.

History
Little Cedar was platted in 1891. It was at first known as Wheeler, but the name was changed to avoid confusion with another existing Wheeler in the state. Little Cedar's population was 22 in 1902, and 200 in 1925.

Demographics

As of the census of 2010, there were 60 people, 29 households, and 16 families residing in the town. There were 30 housing units at an average density of 16.9 per square mile (6.5/km). The racial makeup of the town was 100.0% White.

There were 29 households, out of which 27.6% had children under the age of 18 living with them, 41.4% were married couples living together, 3.4% had a female householder with no husband present, 10.3% had a male householder with no wife present, and 44.8% were non-families. 41.4% of all households were made up of individuals, and 17.2% had someone living alone who was 65 years of age or older. The average household size was 2.07 and the average family size was 2.88.

In the city the population was spread out, with 21.7% under the age of 18, 8.3% from 18 to 24, 23.3% from 25 to 44, 30% from 45 to 64, and 16.7% who were 65 years of age or older. The median age was 40.5 years. The gender makeup of the city was 55.0% male and 45.0% female.

References

Unincorporated communities in Mitchell County, Iowa
Unincorporated communities in Iowa